is a monorail station on the Chiba Urban Monorail in Chūō-ku in the city of Chiba, Chiba Prefecture, Japan. It is located 2.0 kilometers from the terminus of the line at Chiba Station.

Lines
 Chiba Urban Monorail Line 1

Station layout
Sakaechō Station is an elevated station with one island platform serving two tracks.

Platforms

History
Sakaechō Station opened on March 24, 1999.

See also
 List of railway stations in Japan

External links

Chiba Urban Monorail website 

Railway stations in Japan opened in 1999
Railway stations in Chiba Prefecture